Dan Sexton (born April 29, 1987) is an American professional ice hockey winger. He is currently playing with Växjö Lakers HC of the Swedish Hockey League (SHL).

Playing career
Dan Sexton played for Bowling Green State University from 2007–2009, playing 76 games and recording 24 goals and 60 points in his NCAA career.
 
Sexton, an undrafted free agent, left college when he was signed by the Anaheim Ducks on April 7, 2009. After beginning the 2009–10 season in the minors with the Bakersfield Condors in the ECHL, he was called up to the Ducks and played his first NHL game against the Minnesota Wild on December 4, 2009. Sexton recorded his first two NHL goals in his third NHL game on December 8, 2009, in a 4-3 win against the Dallas Stars at the Honda Center.

On July 11, 2011, Sexton re-signed a two-year, two-way contract with the Anaheim Ducks. During the 2012–13 season, on March 11, 2013, Sexton was traded by the Ducks to the Tampa Bay Lightning in exchange for Kyle Wilson.

Having initially moved abroad as a free agent in signing with Finnish club, HC TPS of the Liiga, Sexton left mid-season and played in the KHL for the following 5 seasons with HC Neftekhimik Nizhnekamsk. In the 2017–18 season, Sexton led Neftekhimik in scoring and finished 7th in league scoring with 47 points in 52 games.

Prior to the 2018–19 season, Sexton left Nizhnekamsk as a free agent, and signed a contract with Avtomobilist Yekaterinburg on May 2, 2018.

Sexton played three seasons with Avtomobilist, before leaving the club as a free agent and securing one-year contract in a return to former club, Neftekhimik Nizhnekamsk, for the 2021–22 season on May 17, 2021. In his second stint with Neftekhimik, Sexton posted 7 goals and 24 points through 46 games. He initially participated in the postseason, despite the abrupt exit of many foreign players and two non-Russia based KHL teams (Dinamo Riga and Jokerit Helsinki) due to the 2022 Russian invasion of Ukraine, before leaving the club after two games on March 4, 2022.

On July 27, 2022, as a free agent Sexton signed an optional two-year contract with Swedish club, Växjö Lakers of the SHL.

Career statistics

Regular season and playoffs

International

Awards and honors

References

External links

1987 births
Living people
American men's ice hockey right wingers
Anaheim Ducks players
Avtomobilist Yekaterinburg players
Bakersfield Condors (1998–2015) players
Bowling Green Falcons men's ice hockey players
Ice hockey players from Minnesota
Manitoba Moose players
HC Neftekhimik Nizhnekamsk players
Norfolk Admirals players
People from Apple Valley, Minnesota
Sioux Falls Stampede players
Syracuse Crunch players
HC TPS players
Undrafted National Hockey League players
Växjö Lakers players
Wichita Falls Wildcats players